The sharp-nosed chameleon (Kinyongia oxyrhina) is a chameleon native to the Uluguru and Udzungwa Mountains of Tanzania. Its length averages 16 cm (6.5 in). Females are smaller than males, and have smaller helmet protrusions. They are usually coloured white, gray, brown and ochre. Males have bluish horns.

The sharp-nosed chameleon was scientifically described in 1988.

References

Kinyongia
Lizards of Africa
Reptiles described in 1988
Taxa named by Wolfgang Böhme (herpetologist)